is a  fictional character featured in the trilogy of Japanese chanbara films of the same name. The films star Shintaro Katsu as the title character. He also produced the trilogy through his own Katsu Productions.

After the decline of Daiei at the end of the 1960s, Shintaro Katsu established his own independent production company in 1967 called Katsu Productions. In 1972, Katsu Productions released the chanbara film trilogy with the Hanzo the Razor: Sword of Justice based on a gekiga by Koike Kazuo. 

The film series, about an incorruptible law enforcer during the Edo period, has a strong sense of justice which dictates his every move. The film incorporates elements of exploitation film, and is highly sexual: Hanzo has an outlandishly large penis which is a recurring theme, and he uses it to interrogate women, usually by rape, to reveal a cases' hidden secrets and truths.

Films

Recurring cast and characters
 This table only includes characters which have appeared in more than one film.
 A dark grey cell indicates the character was not in the film, or that the character's presence in the film has not yet been announced.

Crew

References

Footnotes

Sources

External links
 
 
 

Action film series
Fictional samurai
Live-action films based on manga
Films about rape
Japanese film series
1970s action films